Montenegro competed at the 2022 European Championships in Munich, Germany, from 11–21 August 2018.

Medallists

Competitors
The following is the list of number of competitors in the Championships:

Athletics

References

2022
Nations at the 2022 European Championships
European Championships